These are lists of the chartered cities or städer and the historical districts or härader of the historical province of Bohuslän in Sweden, until 1658 part of Norway.

Cities
Kungälv (city since 12th century)
Lysekil (town charter 1836, city charter 1903)
Marstrand (city since 13th century)
Strömstad (town charter 1667, city charter 1672)
Uddevalla (city charter 1498)

Districts
Bullarens
Hisings Västra (named Norska Hisingen, until 1681)
Inlands Fräkne
Inlands Torpe
Inlands Nordre
Inlands Södre
Kville
Lane
Orust Västra
Orust Östra
Sotenäs
Stångenäs
Sörbygdens
Tanums
Tjörns
Tunge
Vette

 
Bohuslän